Resinoids are extracts of resinous plant exudates (balsams, oleo gum resins, and natural oleoresins).

Production 
Resinous plant exudates (balsams, oleo gum resins, and natural oleoresins) and animal secretions (ambergris, castoreum, musk, and civet) are extracted with solvents such as methanol, ethanol, toluene, or acetone. Yields range from 50 to 95%. The products mainly consist of nonvolatile, resinous compounds. They are usually highly viscous and are sometimes diluted (e.g., with phthalates or benzyl benzoate) to improve their flow and processing properties.

Uses 
Resinoids are mainly used as perfume fixatives.

Oleoresins 
The resinoids described above should be distinguished from prepared oleoresins (e.g., pepper, ginger, vanilla oleoresins), which are concentrates prepared from spices by solvent extraction. The solvent that is used depends on the spice; currently, these products are often obtained by extraction with supercritical carbon dioxide. Pepper and ginger oleoresins contain not only volatile aroma compounds, but also substances responsible for pungency.

References 

Perfumery
Resins